Vijayalakshmy Subramaniam is an Carnatic music vocalist.  As a student and performer of classical music for over three decades, she has performed extensively in India and abroad since the age of twelve. She has conducted numerous workshops and lecture demonstrations on the various aspects of Carnatic Music. She has presented papers at international conferences in many countries over the last decade. In June 2007, she brought out a book "Apoorva Kriti Manjari" – a collection of twenty rare compositions of the Trinity of Carnatic Music. The book has notations in English and Tamil by musicologist S. Balachander and the audio has been rendered by Vijayalakshmy. A doctorate in music, Vijayalakshmy was awarded the Fulbright Visiting Lecturer Fellowship in 2010. As part of the programme, she taught the subject 'An Introduction to Indian Music' at the Duke University, North Carolina, USA, as a visiting Fulbright fellow (Aug – Nov 2010).

Music Training
Vijayalakshmy Subramaniam started her training in Carnatic Music at the age of five under K. Padmanabhan, a disciple of Harikesanallur Muthiah Bhagavathar from the Swati Tirunal Academy, Trivandrum. She learnt detailed aspects of manodharma sangita or improvisation under the guidance of guru Sangeeta Bhushanam K Krishnaswamy of Annamalai University. Her gurus also include Vidwans S.Rajam, T. R. Subramaniam and V. R. Krishnan.

Academics & Scholarships
PhD in music, Annamalai University, Tamil Nadu – March 2011. Thesis topic: "Tamil Composers of the Twentieth Century". The dissertation involved assimilation and documentation of Tamil Composers and a critical analysis of the musical and lyrical value of their compositions
Fulbright Visiting Lecturer Fellowship, USA, 2010
Sangeet Alankar, 1987, Gandharva Mahavidyalaya, New Delhi (A masters level program)
Sahitya Kala Parishad, New Delhi Scholarship, 1983–1985
Sangeet Shiromani, 1982, Music Faculty, Delhi University (Diploma in Carnatic Music)
Government of India Junior Talent Scholarship, 1977–1983

The Fulbright Fellowship
Vijayalakshmy Subramaniam was awarded the Fulbright Visiting Lecturer Fellowship by the United States Department of State, Bureau of Educational Affairs in 2010. As part of the programme, she was invited as a visiting lecturer to the Duke University, Durham, North Carolina, USA, to teach the subject – 'An Introduction to Indian Music' (Aug – Nov 2010) and also taught for a month at the North Carolina State University, Raleigh.

Teacher
Vijayalakshmy teaches vocal music.

Albums Released
Apoorva Kriti Manjari
Kritis of Annamayya – Charsur Digital Workstation
Raga Series – TODI – Charsur Digital Workstation
Kshetra Sringeri – Charsur Digital Workstation
Muruga Muruga – Rajalakshmi Audio
Madrasil Margazhi – Rajalakshmi Audio
Sarvanandham – Rajalakshmi Audio

Awards
Nada Bhushanam, Shanmukhananda Sangeetha Sabha, New Delhi, March 2012
M.S Subbulakshmi Award instituted by Narada Gana Sabha, Chennai, Dec 2010
'Best Pallavi rendition' prize, The Music Academy, Chennai, Jan 2007
'Sahityapriya' award from Kalavardhani, June 2006
'Sarada Krishna Iyer award for outstanding performance' from The Music Academy, Chennai, Jan 2005
'Tulasivana Puraskaram' from the Tulasivanam Parishat, Kerala, December 2004.
'Sangeetha Shikamani' award form the Andhra Social and Cultural Association, Chennai, 2000
'Gaana Seva Rathnam' award from the Purandara Dasar Aradhana Mahotsava Sabha, Chennai, 1997
'Best Vocalist' award for the sub senior category from The Music Academy, Annual Music Festival, in 1996 and 1999
'Outstanding Young Person' award from the Jaycees, Kilpauk Chamber, Chennai, 1996

See also

References

Kshetra Sangeetham – Coverage in THE HINDU – Jan 2012
Music For A Cause Concert – Oct 2011
Concert for REACH – an NGO – Sep 2011
Concert Review – 2009 Music Season
Interview – The Hindu – 2008
An Article on Vidwan Shri S.Rajam
Concert Review on Dinamani – A leading Tamil Daily
Other news reviews and articles
ITC Sangeet Research Academy
About Kshetra Sangeetham on CarnaticDarbar.com
About Kshetra Sangeetham on CarnaticIndia.com

External links
Vijayalakshmy Subramaniam's Website

External links

 https://www.newindianexpress.com/cities/chennai/2013/feb/09/a-journey-of-musical-heritage-448770.html

Women Carnatic singers
Carnatic singers
Indian women classical singers
Performers of Hindu music
Living people
Annamalai University alumni
Year of birth missing (living people)
Singers from Thiruvananthapuram
Women musicians from Kerala
21st-century Indian scholars
21st-century Indian women singers
21st-century Indian singers